Muhammad Kanta Kotal, also known as Kanta Kotal, was a Hausa Warrior and Military General who became the first King of Kebbi, now a state in Northern Nigeria. Kanta was the chief in charge of the Province of Lekka (now known as Kebbi), then under the Songhai Empire.

As a General in the Songhai Army, he was suspected to have been a pivotal figure in the alleged conquest that saw the Empire conquer five of the most powerful Hausa States (Kano, Gobir, Katsina, Zazzau and Zamfara) and more definitively Agadez. Kanta rebelled against Askia the great after a dispute over the spoils of war and declared Kebbi an independent Kingdom. He then renovated the city and fortified its defenses and was able to deftly hold off multiple reprisal attacks by the Songhai Empire and to defeat them in multiple battles. Kanta Kotal would go on to conquer some of its former tributaries including a few other Hausa states and Agadez, expelling Songhai forces in these regions. Kotal would also succeed in defeating the Bornu Empire and keeping the Moroccans from Hausa Land.

An astute leader and a fearless warrior, for a time Kebbi emerged as the most powerful Hausa State and one of the most powerful Kingdoms in the Sahel during the first half of the 16th century. At its height, Kebbi wrestled successfully with some of the most powerful states in the continent. Kanta Kotal is one of the most prominent figures among a wave of great leaders that emerged in the Sahel between the 14th and 16th Centuries.

Early life 
Muhammad was born to princess Tamatu of Katsina. His father, Mukata was said to be a descendant of Uthman Nann Ibn Mas'ud who was said to be leader of a group in charge of water supply at the Ka'abah. Kanta set out of Katsina and became a herder for the fula people. He immediately solidified himself as a formidable warrior. He floored every single opponent he boxed or wrestled with, earning him the epithet "Kotal", which means "No Challenger".

Military career 
Towards the end of the 15th Century, Kotal joined the army of Songhai empire where he was designated a war chief in charge of Kebbi region. Kanta was said to have assisted the empire in its conquests in Hausa Land.  He then joined the army of the Emperor on their successful campaign in Agadez. It is also possible that the expeditions against the Hausa States were single-handedly carried out by him at a later date.

Dispute and Revolt Against Askia 
Following the expedition in Agadez, Kotal got concerned that the King did not intend to share the spoils of the conquest. When he voiced his concerns to the Dendi Fari (Governor of the Eastern front) he was rebuffed and warned that he would be considered by the prince to be a rebel if he did. Some of Kotal's men came to him with the same concerns about the booty and he explained to them what transpired between him and the Dendi Fari but assured them that if they would support him, he would lay claim to their share of the spoils to which they agreed. He returned to the Dendi-Fari but was denied again and a battle broke out between his men and the army of the empire. Kanta's soldiers were able to hold their own against the emperors army and fought them to a standstill after which he dissolved his alliance with Askiya, returned and declared himself King.

King of Kebbi 
Muhammad Kanta Kotal declared Kebbi a kingdom and himself its first King. He built moats and trenches to make Kebbi as secure as possible. Some of these structures are still erect especially in the Kingdoms capital Surame. He then laid claim to former Songhai tributaries including Agadez and parts of Hausa land including Yauri.

Subsequent Wars with the Songhai Empire 
Kanta ambushed Askia Muhammed on an annual tour of provinces and forced him to flee. Kebbi fully gained independence a year later after defeating Songhai forces at Tara in 1517 . The Songhai Empire made attempts to regain Kebbi but their attempts proved futile. Most notably, they attempted to subdue Kebbi at Watarmasa led by Askia Mohammad Benkan where they were handily defeated and forced to flee with Kebbi in hot pursuit, the Askia barely escaped with his life. This crushing defeat contributed to the fall of the Songhai Empire. Soon the empire was overrun by the Moroccans and were no match for their advanced muskets and cannons.

Expedition in Bornu and Other Conquests 
Kanta Kotal was said to have conquered other states in the region including Nupe and Zabarma and the influence of the king reached further down south. In 1545, Kebbi defeated the Mai of Bornu's Army. Bornu under Mai Muhammad Ibn Idrissi came to the aid of Agadez after signing peace treaties but was forced to flee to Unguru where they lost seven battles against Kebbi.

Defeating the Moors 
The Moroccans attempted to overrun the Hausa States through the west but were defeated by Kebbi.

Personal life 
While Kotal Kanta had multiple concubines, it is said he had just one wife who was of unrivaled beauty.

Death 
Muhammad Kanta Kotal died from a poisoned arrow after he was attacked by some guerrillas in Dugul, Katsina on his way back from the expedition in Bornu. He died in Jirwa, Katsina but was taken home and buried in Surame. He was succeeded by his son, Muhammadu, during whose rule the kingdom experienced a fast decline. Kebbi would however continue to dominate Gobir, Zamfara and Agadez until the 18th century when an alliance between the States broke Kebbi's authority over them.

References 

Hausa warriors
Kebbi State
People of the Songhai Empire